Totale's Turns (It's Now or Never) is a (mostly) live album by the Fall, released on 5 May 1980.

Recording and release
The first of the band's many live and part-live albums, it was mostly recorded at gigs in the north of England, but the track "New Puritan" was recorded at Mark E. Smith's home and "That Man" is a studio recording, an outtake from the recording sessions for the "Fiery Jack" single.

Rather than record themselves in front of a receptive home crowd, the Fall chose to use recordings made in working men's clubs and other less obvious settings; Side 1 of the album was recorded at a leisure centre near Doncaster while the first two tracks on Side 2 are from a February 1980 gig in Bradford. It is clear on the recording that the reception the band received ranged from indifferent to hostile, the enmity between band and audience evident from Smith's introductory statement "The difference between you and us is that we have brains". Friction within the band is also apparent, with Smith apparently chastising one of the musicians during "No Xmas for John Quays" with "Will you fuckin' get it together instead of showing off".

Smith said of the album in his 2008 book Renegade: 
"Nobody wanted to release it, because nobody played the sort of venues that you hear on it – places like Doncaster and Preston. The North was out of bounds; it might as well have been another country. We just pieced a load of tapes together. In the band's eyes it was commercial suicide releasing this dirge; they couldn't see the soul that lay behind it. That's musicians for you."

The album was released on 5 May 1980, the band's first release after signing to Rough Trade Records.

Reception

Dave McCullough in Sounds gave the album a five star rating, calling the band "a living reminder of the failure of Punk and the almost solitary exponents of the directions in which it should have gone". Robert Christgau gave the album a B rating, describing himself as "a sucker for the overall sound, maybe even the attitude". AllMusic reviewer Ned Raggett gave the album three stars, stating that it saw the band in "a hilariously aggressive mood", and delivering "some brilliant performances". Martin Longley, in a 1998 review, gave it three stars, calling it "a terse, brittle classic of cranky Mark E. Smith ranting". A 2002 review of the reissued album was given two stars by Marc Savlov in The Austin Chronicle, describing it as "live with God-awful acoustics and utter crap recording that renders it barely there at the best moments". Trouser Press described the album as "Jagged, largely recitative and nearly oblivious to musical convention, Smith's witty repartee carries the show as the band lurches and grunts along noisily."

The album was chosen by Luke Haines in 2011 as one of his favourite thirteen albums.

The album topped the UK Independent Chart in 1980, spending a total of 31 weeks on the chart.

Reissues
The album has been issued on CD several times, in 1992 by Dojo, in 1998 and 2004 by Castle Communications, and in 2017 by Westworld Recordings. The 2004 Castle reissue included the Fall's third Peel session as bonus tracks. It was reissued on vinyl in 2004 by Earmark, and in 2017 by Let Them Eat Vinyl.

Track listing

Recording notes
Tracks 1-6: recorded live at Bircoats Leisure Centre, Doncaster, 27 October 1979
Tracks 7 and 8: recorded live at Palm Cove, Bradford, 29 February 1980
Track 9: studio outtake from the "Fiery Jack" sessions; recorded in Wales, September 1979
Track 10: home demo recording from Mark E. Smith's house in Prestwich
Track 11: recorded live at The Warehouse, Preston, 22 November 1979 
Tracks 12-15: John Peel Session; recorded 16 September 1980

Personnel 
 The Fall

 Mark E. Smith – vocals
 Marc Riley – guitar, keyboards
 Craig Scanlon – guitar
 Steve Hanley – bass 
 Mike Leigh – drums

Additional musicians
 Paul Hanley – drums (tracks 12-15)

References

The Fall (band) live albums
1980 live albums
Rough Trade Records live albums